Benjamin John Braymer (born April 28, 1994) is an American professional baseball pitcher who is currently a free agent. He made his MLB debut in 2020.

Baseball career
A Louisiana native, Braymer began his college baseball career at Louisiana State University at Eunice where, in 2015, he struck out an NJCAA record 138 batters en route to a national championship. , that record still stands. After two years, he transferred to Auburn University where he was an eighteenth-round selection by the Nationals in the 2016 Major League Baseball draft, where he was roommates with Gabe Klobosits, who was drafted by the Nationals the following year. In his first full professional season in 2017, Braymer pitched for the Class-A Short Season Auburn Doubledays and the Class-A Hagerstown Suns. He and Klobosits were both among several minor league pitchers brought over to pitch to the major league Nationals hitters as they prepared for the 2017 National League Division Series.

Braymer led all Nationals minor league pitchers with a 2.28 ERA in 2018, pitching for the Suns and Class-A Advanced Potomac Nationals. Along with Wil Crowe, he was named the Nationals' co-Minor League Pitcher of the Year. He was one of eight Nationals prospects invited to participate in the Arizona Fall League after the 2018 season, where he played for the Salt River Rafters.

Before the 2019 season, MLB Pipeline ranked Braymer as Washington's 25th-best prospect. In late June 2019, he was promoted to the highest minor league level for the first time, joining the starting rotation of the Triple-A Fresno Grizzlies.

Braymer was added to the Nationals' 40–man roster following the 2019 season. He made his major league debut on August 28, 2020, giving up one run in two innings in a win over the Boston Red Sox at Fenway Park. In his rookie season, Braymer logged a 1.23 ERA across 3 appearances.

Braymer was assigned to the Triple-A Rochester Red Wings to begin the 2021 season. After struggling to a 1-5 record and 6.75 ERA in 7 appearances, Braymer was designated for assignment on June 20, 2021, following the selection of Gerardo Parra. He was outrighted to Rochester on June 24. He was released on May 27, 2022.

References

External links

Living people
1994 births
Auburn Doubledays players
Auburn Tigers baseball players
Baseball players from Baton Rouge, Louisiana
Fresno Grizzlies players
Gulf Coast Nationals players
Hagerstown Suns players
Harrisburg Senators players
LSU Eunice Bengals baseball players
Potomac Nationals players
Rochester Red Wings players
Salt River Rafters players
Washington Nationals players